A Masque of Reason is a 1945 comedy written by Robert Frost. This short play purports to be the 43rd chapter of the book of Job, which only has 42 chapters. Thus, Frost has written a concluding chapter in the form of the play. In this play Robert Frost, like John Milton in Paradise Lost, wants to justify God's ways to man. The image of Steeple Bush is apparent in describing the tree.

Plot
Job and his wife are sitting out under a palm tree when a tree, called the Burning Bush or The Christmas Tree, enlightens itself. The couple explain that this tree rustling is God, and he has come to talk to them. It ends up actually being God, and Job goes over and talks to him. God sets up his throne ("a plywood flat, prefabricated" that God pulls upright on its hinges to support him) and talks to Job about his condition (because he was ill). God then says "You are the Emancipator of your God, and as such I promote you a saint". Job is grateful of this title, and then his wife comes along, and tells God about her punishment when she was accused of witchcraft. God apologizes for his lack of action, explaining "That is not Of record in my Note Book."

External links
 

1945 plays
Works by Robert Frost
Henry Holt and Company books